The 2012 Alaska Republican presidential caucuses were held Super Tuesday, March 6, 2012. The presidential preference poll portion of the caucuses was scheduled between 4 pm and 8 pm local time (which is 8 pm to midnight EST) at locations across the state and one caucus in Washington, D.C.

Similar to the 2012 Nevada caucuses, the results of the presidential preference poll will be used to directly and proportionately apportion 24 national convention delegates among the candidates. Another 3 super delegates are unbound and not determined by the caucus results.

Results

References

External links
The Green Papers: for Alaska
The Green Papers: Major state elections in chronological order

Republican presidential caucuses
Alaska
2012
March 2012 events in the United States